Covid-19 impact on pregnant women is the prenatal maternal stress that Covid-19 places the fetus and on the expectant mother. This impact can include psychosocial or physical stress caused by daily life events or by environmental hardships. Mental health issues, such as maternal depression, affect 10-20% of women and are linked to a variety of negative child outcomes. Prenatal stress has been demonstrated to affect the critical development stages in postnatal life that persist throughout adulthood. Health risks include impaired cognitive development, low birth weight, and risk of mental disorders in the offspring. Epigenetics may also be associated with the biological processes involved in prenatal stress, possibly leading to fetal programming.

On fetal development 
Stress on the mother during pregnancy can lead to issues cognitive development, social development and more.  A great deal of brain development happens during the fetal period in pregnancy and the progress happens rapidly in this stage. Since there is such a large amount of growth occurring during this time-period in the child's life, there are a lot of outside factors in the environment that can affect this development. These outside factors could be anything from poor nutrition, excess cortisol levels to even genetic influences. The fetus development can be impacted through the level of the placenta, there is evidence to show how prenatal stress can have consequences on the placenta and in turn the fetus during pregnancy.

The resulting effects can impact many different areas of the developing child's brain, and these impacts have mostly been noted in animal studies because of the concerns that surround human studies with prenatal stress. The ethical concerns with human studies and prenatal stress have led to little to no studies showing the direct impacts stress can have on fetal development, and it has shown to be difficult to draw inferences and connections between the animal studies and human pregnancies. It has been suggested that one way to monitor the impact of stress on the infant's development is through the mother's exposure to natural disasters.

On pregnant women 
Prenatal stress has increased as a result of the recent changes caused by the covid-19 pandemic. Researchers are attempting to determine how the pandemic relates to prenatal stress, why so many women are experiencing stress and anxiety, and how these issues can be avoided. Researchers conducted a study by developing a questionnaire for pregnant women that included age, sex, race, health insurance status, financial status, any pregnancy risks, medical conditions, treatments, doctor's appointments, how many appointments were canceled due to covid-19, and stress levels on a scale of mild, moderate, and severe. Three-quarters of the research participants were white or non-hispanic, according to the questionnaire. There were 280 women who reported mild cases, 170 who reported moderate cases, and 171 who reported severe cases. Following the questionnaire, researchers discovered that mothers were experiencing high levels of anxiety and stress because they were afraid of contacting the covid virus and having the virus affect their fetus, having one person in the delivery room, and making online appointments without being checked in person. As a result, researchers proposed that there should be in-person engagement for the mother, information provided to the mother about covid-19 and the protocols to reduce the risk of contacting it, and consistent check-in appointments to check the mother's mental health status.

References 

Wikipedia Student Program
COVID-19
Human pregnancy
Pandemics
Mental health
Anxiety
Stress (biological and psychological)
Health research